Wimbledon Chase is a south-west London suburb part of the wider Wimbledon area. It takes its name from Wimbledon Chase railway station and thus it is an informal definition: parts vie with the definitions of Merton Park, which has a tram link stop to the east of Wimbledon Chase station.  Also contemporary suburb names which compete with the definition of this modestly-sized district of Merton to the west and south are Raynes Park and South Merton, respectively.

The area contains Wimbledon Chase Primary School and is largely residential in character, with a small parade of shops on Kingston Road (including a Co-operative Food, a Tesco Express and a BP garage with an M&S concession).

History
See Merton, London (parish)

Local geography

Wimbledon Chase is in southwest Wimbledon.

References

Areas of London
Districts of the London Borough of Merton